= Dhenlo =

Festival in Goa, India

Dhenlo (also known as Dino or Dhindlo) is a traditional festival celebrated by herdsmen (rakhne). It is observed on the day of Gorwanchyo Padvo (the cattle festival), which falls on Kartik Shuddha Padva. The festival is centered around cattle (gorva) and is historically celebrated in villages where the local economy is heavily dependent on livestock rearing.

== Etymology and origins ==
The name Dhenlo is derived from the word Dino. The protective deity of the cattle is referred to as Rakhno or Dino, and the festival dedicated to this deity is called Dhinlo or Dhenlo. The group of people who celebrate this festival are traditionally known as Dines.

The protective deity is also termed Gavali, meaning a person who tends to a herd (gaval). In earlier times, every village appointed a specific individual to manage the herd, who acted as the leader of the herdsmen. Following ancient traditions where founding ancestors were given divine status, the original village herdsman eventually achieved godly form and was addressed as Dino. The Dhenlo festival originated as a way to praise and honor this deity for safeguarding the cattle.

Historical tracing of the festival's roots indicates that the Gavali tradition emerged from within the Gawdo community of Goa. This link is visible in contemporary customs, such as the traditional naming rituals (naav ghevap) of women belonging to the Gavali community, where they make references to being the wife of a specific Gawdo.

== Community and regional significance ==
In the ancient village administrative setup of Goa, the Gawdo and Naik communities were primarily engaged in agricultural occupations. Consequently, the festival is predominantly celebrated in Goan villages that have a high population or dominance of these two communities. It is also observed to varying degrees by other households that own cattle.

Similar cattle-related observances occur in neighboring regions on the same day. In Maharashtra, herdsmen visit cowsheds to perform a ritual waving of lamps (unvalat) before the cattle. Among the Warli tribe, it is customary to shape a symbolic mountain (dongar) out of cow dung at the entrance of their homes.

== Rituals and celebrations ==
=== Morning cattle worship ===
Celebrations begin early in the morning with the worship of the cattle, a ritual traditionally performed by a young Dino boy from the household. Prior to the prayers, the cattle are washed, and their horns are decorated with paint. Garlands made of marigold flowers (roja) or decorative tassels made from the bark of the kumyo tree are tied around their necks. Following the worship, oil is applied to the heads of the animals, and rings crafted from coconut (nallache vole) are secured around their necks. The cattle are then fed traditional rice cakes, specifically sanna and pole, before being set loose.

=== Preparation of the Dhenlo object ===
Before the village cattle wander into the forest, all the local herdsmen assemble in the woods. They gather the flower garlands and coconut rings from the necks of the cattle to decorate the Dhenlo. The ritual involves placing fresh cow dung onto a wooden plank (falem) and embedding a stone on top to represent the protective deity Rakhno. This sacred stone is normally preserved throughout the year in a designated forest location or within the hollow of a tree. The plank is further decorated using the cattle's garlands and blades of darbha grass. Once decorated, the herdsmen carry the Dhenlo assembly to the village to dance at the doorsteps of various houses according to local protocols of respect.

=== Courtyard rituals and the Dhenlo dance ===
In every village household, an arrangement or shape made of cow dung called a gaval (also known as a gotho or gokul) is set up in the courtyard. Within this structure, symbolic figures of cattle are fashioned using jackfruit leaves or twigs attached with thorns, alongside a straw doll representing the herdsman (gavali). A young Dino boy from the family, wearing ritually clean attire (anvalyanni), performs a puja for this courtyard arrangement and offers a food sacrifice (naivedya). In front of this gaval, the visiting herdsmen perform the specialized Dhenlo dance. Two herdsmen hold opposite sides of the wooden plank. While standing upright, they execute unique steps by swinging one leg or pole to the right and the other to the left. Because their hands must remain fixed on the plank, the dance involves no upper body or hand gestures, relying entirely on rhythmic foot movements. Accompanying herdsmen provide rhythm by playing cymbals (taal), clapping their hands, and singing short traditional Dhenlo songs.

=== Forest feast and conclusion ===
At each household where they perform, the dancers receive offerings of coconut and rice. After completing the tour of all the village homes, the herdsmen return to the forest with their collections. They cook a collective meal using the accumulated rice and coconuts, offer it as naivedya to the deity, and then consume it.

During this gathering, a spiritual trance or possession (avsar) occurs upon one of the herdsmen. The other herdsmen utilize this moment to ask the possessed individual questions concerning any issues or difficulties related to their livestock. Finally, they offer a petition prayer (garane) to the deity to ensure the future safety of their cattle and calves. The men then proceed to a specific river to take a bath, returning to the village at dusk (teensanj). The flowers and coconut components used in the Dhenlo are subsequently distributed among them as sacred prasad.

=== Dismantling and subsequent customs ===
Upon returning to the village, the courtyard gaval setup near the doorway is dismantled. A small clay lamp (panti) is lit and placed over the remaining cow dung, and the straw doll representing the herdsman is given a formal farewell by throwing it onto the roof of the house. The next morning, seven cow dung cakes (shenyo) are patted from this dung, initiating the seasonal practice of preparing cow dung cakes.

== Modern adaptations ==
The contemporary celebration of the Dhenlo festival has seen notable evolution. In modern times, the traditional wooden plank has largely been replaced by ghumats (canopies or dome-like structures), while the traditional stone representation of the deity has frequently been substituted with formal idols of Lord Krishna. Within Goa, the Dhenlo celebrations conducted in the Antruz Mahal region are highly celebrated, where the event has transformed to take on the grand format of a chariot festival (rathotsava).
